Center Point is an unincorporated community and census-designated place (CDP) in San Juan County, New Mexico, United States. It was first listed as a CDP prior to the 2020 census.

The CDP is in the northeast part of the county, bordered to the south by the city of Aztec, the county seat, and to the northeast by Cedar Hill. It is in the valley of the Animas River, a southwest-flowing tributary of the San Juan River. U.S. Route 550 runs through the CDP, leading southwest  to the center of Aztec and north  to Durango, Colorado.

Demographics

Education
The school district is Aztec Municipal Schools. Aztec High School is the local high school.

References 

Census-designated places in San Juan County, New Mexico
Census-designated places in New Mexico